Schoenus or Schoinous was a town in the centre of ancient Arcadia near Methydrium. It was said to have derived its name from the Boeotian Shoenus.

Its site is unlocated.

References

Populated places in ancient Arcadia
Former populated places in Greece
Lost ancient cities and towns